The 2021 Five Star Movement leadership election was an Italian online primary election held on 6 August 2021 that determined the president of the M5S. The election was de facto a plebiscite in which party's members were asked to approve or reject the candidacy of former prime minister Giuseppe Conte as new leader. Conte easily won the election with 92.8% of votes.

Background
In February 2021, Prime Minister Giuseppe Conte was forced to resign, after losing the absolute majority in the Senate of the Republic. On 28 February 2021, after a few days from the end of his premiership, Conte joined the Five Star Movement (M5S), the party which proposed his candidacy as Prime Minister in June 2018.

After a few days, the founder and so-called Guarantor of the M5S, Beppe Grillo, gave Conte the task of writing a new party's statute and announced that Conte would become the new political leader. In the following months, however, tensions grown up between the two politicians. In June, Grillo accused Conte of aiming at create a one-man party and of being "without a political vision". The former Prime Minister threatened to found his own political movement, stating that Grillo "can not stop this useful political project". In July 2021, Conte and Grillo found a compromise on the new statute and leadership elections were called on 6 August.

Candidates

Results

Leadership

Statute

References

2021 elections in Italy
Political party leadership elections in Italy
Five Star Movement
Five Star Movement leadership election
Giuseppe Conte